Kaliam Awan is a town in Gujar Khan Tehsil in Rawalpindi district in the Pakistani province of Punjab. Kalyam Awan is the chief town of Union Council Kalyam Awan is an administrative subdivision of the Tehsil.

See also 
 Awans of Pakistan

References

Union councils of Gujar Khan Tehsil